The League of Communists of Macedonia (Sojuz na komunistite na Makedonija, SKM) was the Macedonian branch of the ruling League of Communists of Yugoslavia during the period 1943 – 1990. It was formed on the base of the Regional Committee of Communists in Macedonia under the name Communist Party of Macedonia (Комунистичка партија на Македонија (КПМ); Komunistička partija na Makedonija, KPM) during the antifascist National Liberation War of Macedonia in World War II. It retained that name until April 1952.

The League of Communists of Macedonia was the ruling political party in the Socialist Republic of Macedonia. Its successor after the introduction of political pluralism in 1990 was the socialist party League of Communists of Macedonia – Party for Democratic Change ( [СКМ-ПДП]; Sojuz na Komunistite na Makedonija – Partija za Demokratska Preobrazba, [SKM-PDP]) led by Petar Gošev, which took part in the first democratic elections in the same year. On its 11th Congress on April 20, 1991, the party was reformed, changing its socialist ideology to social democracy (similar to other former communist bloc countries), and refounding itself as the Social Democratic Union of Macedonia. There was a small minority which retained the old name and constituted itself as a distinct political entity. This organization was founded in 1992 under the name League of Communists of Macedonia - Freedom Movement.

Gallery

Party leaders 

The official name of the office was changed in May 1982 from Secretary of the Central Committee to President of the Presidency of the Central Committee of the League of Communists of Macedonia.
 Lazar Koliševski (September 1944 – July 1963)
 Krste Crvenkovski (July 1963 – March 1969)     
 Angel Čemerski (March 1969 – May 1982)
 Krste Markovski (May 1982 –  5 May 1984)    
 Milan Pančevski (5 May 1984 – June 1986)                 
 Jakov Lazaroski (June 1986 – 1989)        
 Petar Gošev (1989 – 20 April 1991)

See also
History of North Macedonia
League of Communists of Yugoslavia
League of Communists of Bosnia and Herzegovina
League of Communists of Croatia
League of Communists of Montenegro
League of Communists of Serbia
League of Communists of Vojvodina
League of Communists of Kosovo
League of Communists of Slovenia
List of leaders of communist Yugoslavia
Socialist Federal Republic of Yugoslavia

Communist parties in North Macedonia
Political parties established in 1943
Political parties disestablished in 1991
Parties of one-party systems
Socialist Republic of Macedonia
Politics of Yugoslavia
League of Communists of Yugoslavia